Chelčice is a municipality and village in Strakonice District in the South Bohemian Region of the Czech Republic. It has about 400 inhabitants.

Geography
It lies in the Bohemian Forest Foothills.

History

The first written mention of Chelčice is from 1352.

Economy
Chelčice has a long tradition of fruit growing. The newest varieties of apple, cherry, sour cherry and currant are grown here.

Sights
The landmark of Chelčice is the Church of Saint Martin. The original Romanesque church from the first half of the 13th century was baroque rebuilt in the 17th century. The interior is decorated with valuable frescoes from 1759.

Notable people
Petr Chelčický (c. 1390 – c. 1460), Christian spiritual leader

References

External links

Villages in Strakonice District